Ridgecrest may refer to:

 Ridgecrest, California
 Ridgecrest, Florida
 Ridgecrest, Louisiana
 Ridgecrest, North Carolina

See also